Pycnoporidium is thought to be a genus of red or green alga; one species has been synonymized with the brachiopod Gosaukammerella, leaving the interpretation of the other species uncertain.

References

Fossil algae
Triassic life
Controversial taxa